Buccaneer is a tabletop role-playing game published by Adversary Games in 1979.

Description
Buccaneer is a pirate system, with brief early rules for playing pirate characters in the 17th and 18th centuries. The rules cover character types, progression, blade, gun, and cannon combat, duels, boarding actions, and plunder.

Publication history
Buccaneer was designed by Carl Smith, and published by Adversary Games in 1979 as a digest-sized 16-page book.

Reception

References

Historical role-playing games
Historical Swashbuckler role-playing games
Role-playing games introduced in 1979